The 1991 UC Davis football team represented the University of California, Davis as a member of the Northern California Athletic Conference (NCAC) during the 1991 NCAA Division II football season. Led by third-year head coach Bob Foster, the Aggies compiled an overall record of 7–3 with a mark of 3–2 in conference play, placing second in the NCAC. 1991 was the 22st consecutive winning season for the Aggies, but the first time in 21 years the Aggies did not the conference championship. They had won or shared the championship every year from 1971 to 1990. UC Davis' loss to Chico State on October 29 broke a streak of 52 consecutive conference wins that started in the 1981 season. And it ended a remarkable string of 90 conference wins in 91 games stretching back to the 1981 season. UC Davis outscored its opponents 238 to 215 for the season. The Aggies played home games at Toomey Field in Davis, California.

Schedule

References

UC Davis
UC Davis Aggies football seasons
UC Davis Aggies football